The Sewanhaka Central High School District is a central high school district located in western Nassau County on Long Island, in New York State.  The district is currently composed of five high schools: Sewanhaka High School, Elmont Memorial High School, New Hyde Park Memorial High School, Floral Park Memorial High School, and H. Frank Carey High School.

The schools are fed from separate elementary school districts in the various communities, each having its own board of education.

History
The Sewanhaka Central High School district was created around 1929 with the building of Sewanhaka High School, the first high school in the current district. In the 1950s and 1960s, the additional high schools were built to accommodate the growing population.
Notable alumni include longtime NFL quarterback Vinny Testaverde, Olympic discus champion Al Oerter, and actor Telly Savalas (Kojak).

Schools
The following elementary school districts graduate to attend schools in the Sewanhaka Central High School District:
Elmont Union Free School District
Floral Park-Bellerose Union Free School District
Franklin Square Union Free School District
New Hyde Park-Garden City Park Union Free School District

Sewanhaka High School
Sewanhaka High School was the first high school in the district and also the first in the district to receive the Blue Ribbon Recognition (It was nationally prominent in the 1930s as America's #3 school.)

Floral Park Memorial High School
Floral Park Memorial High School is located in Floral Park.

Elmont Memorial High School 
Elmont Memorial High School is located in Elmont.

New Hyde Park Memorial High School
New Hyde Park Memorial High School is located in North New Hyde Park.

H. Frank Carey High School
H. Frank Carey Junior-Senior High School is located in Franklin Square.

References

External links
District website

School districts in New York (state)
Education in Nassau County, New York
School districts established in 1929